The pygora beetles or flower beetles are scarab beetles of the genus Pygora. They are native to Madagascar.

Species include:
 Pygora albomaculata Kraatz, 1893
 Pygora andranovory Paulian, 1994
 Pygora bella Waterhouse, 1879
 Pygora beryllina Janson 1881
 Pygora bioculata Fairmaire, 1903
 Pygora bourgoini Valck Lucassen, 1930
 Pygora brunneitarsis Moser, 1913
 Pygora conjuncta Gory & Percheron, 1835
 Pygora cowani Waterhouse, 1878
 Pygora cribricollis Fairmaire, 1901
 Pygora cruralis Fairmaire, 1903
 Pygora cultrata Gory & Percheron, 1835
 Pygora cyanea Bourgoin, 1918
 Pygora decorata Janson, 1925
 Pygora descarpentriesi Ruter, 1973
 Pygora diegana Fairmaire, 1903
 Pygora donckieri Bourgoin, 1913
 Pygora earina Bourgoin, 1918
 Pygora erythroderes Blanchard, 1842
 Pygora gerardi Bourgoin, 1924
 Pygora griveaudi Ruter, 1973
 Pygora hirsuta Waterhouse, 1879
 Pygora ignita Westwood, 1879
 Pygora immaculata Fairmaire, 1903
 Pygora lenocinia Gory & Percheron, 1835
 Pygora luctifera Fairmaire, 1899
 Pygora melanura Fairmaire, 1903
 Pygora nigrofasciculata Moser, 1907
 Pygora ornata Janson, 1876
 Pygora perrieri Fairmaire, 1899
 Pygora polyspila Fairmaire, 1903
 Pygora pouillaudei Valck Lucassen 1930
 Pygora prasinella Fairmaire, 1904
 Pygora pulchripes Waterhouse, 1878
 Pygora punctata Janson 1925
 Pygora punctatissima Gory & Percheron, 1835
 Pygora puncticollis Waterhouse, 1879
 Pygora pygidialis Moser 1911
 Pygora pygidialoides Paulian, 1994
 Pygora quatuordecimguttata Kraatz, 1893
 Pygora raharizoninai Paulian, 1994
 Pygora rufoplagiata Westwood, 1879
 Pygora rufovaria Fairmaire, 1903
 Pygora sakarahae Paulian, 1994
 Pygora sanguineomarginata Bourgoin, 1913
 Pygora simillima Moser, 1912
 Pygora tristis Janson, 1925
 Pygora tulearensis Paulian, 1994
 Pygora vadoni Paulian, 1994
 Pygora viridis Valck Lucassen, 1930
 Pygora vohemar Paulian, 1994
 Pygora zombitsy Paulian, 1994

References
Biolib

Cetoniinae
Endemic fauna of Madagascar